Connecticut Lakes State Forest is a  state forest in the town of Pittsburg, New Hampshire, in the United States. The forest forms a narrow strip on either side of U.S. Route 3, running south from the Canadian border around Third and south past Second Connecticut Lake before ending up short of First Connecticut Lake. The area is known for its moose viewing opportunities in late spring and summer during the mornings and evenings, earning it the name nickname "Moose Alley".

See also

List of New Hampshire state forests

References

External links
 U.S. Geological Survey Map at the U.S. Geological Survey Map Website. Retrieved December 13th, 2022.

Landforms of Coös County, New Hampshire
New Hampshire state forests
Protected areas of Coös County, New Hampshire